Statistics of Ekstraklasa for the 1963–64 season.

Overview
It was contested by 14 teams, and Górnik Zabrze won the championship.

League table

Results

Top goalscorers

References
- List of final tables (mogiel.net)

Ekstraklasa seasons
1963–64 in Polish football
Pol